Civil Defence Information Bulletin were a series of seven public information films dealing with civil defence measures individuals and families could take in the event of a nuclear attack on Great Britain. They were produced for the Home Office and the Scottish Home and Health Department by RHR Productions United Kingdom in 1964. The writer was Nicolas Alwyn and the producer Ronald H. Riley, and it starred Robert Urquhart. 

In the event of an international crisis in which nuclear war was imminent, these films were to be broadcast by all television networks in the UK, in much the same manner as the Protect and Survive films were to be broadcast from the late 1970s. The information provided in the films is based on Civil Defence Handbook No. 10 Advising the Householder on Protection against Nuclear Attack.

The films
Topics included in the films include:

 The effects of nuclear weapons: heat, shock wave, and fallout
 Measures to mitigate the effects of the initial heat and blast
 Preparing a fallout room
 Supplies to stock and how to arrange them
 Attack warning signals: Red, attack imminent; Grey, fallout expected within the hour; Black, fallout expected immediately; all-clear
 Immediate steps to protect oneself during the initial heat and blast, with actions similar to the U.S. Civil Defence film Duck and Cover
 Steps to take immediately after a blast but before fallout arrives
 Steps to take after fallout clears
 How to prepare for evacuation

Note: the grey warning was discontinued after 1968.

Each film was a few minutes long and would feature the ominous jingle with the civil defence logo. Then there was a blank title card on the subject matter and then a mix of live-action clips, animation and still images. The warning system features four coloured warning systems (red meaning imminent attack, grey meaning fallout in one hour, black meaning imminent fallout, and finally the all clear) similar to the system formalised by the UK Bikini state levels from 1970.

 Film One: The Hazards. This explains the three main hazards associating with nuclear attack, including how the blast wave can destroy buildings and kill people. It also explains the dangers of fallout. 
 Film Two: Protective Measures. Explains how citizens can safeguard property in the event of nuclear blast. It gives advice on sheltering in homes flats, prefabs, bungalows and similar such accommodation and on protection of walls, doors and windows
 Film Three: Details are given on building a core and food and water supplies.
 Film Four: Preparing The House. Fire precautions. Gives advice on packing an emergency Survival kit for use of evacuation.
 Film Five: What to do if it happens. Explains the four warnings. RED (Attack warning). GREY (fallout expected in one hour). BLACK (imminent fallout). ALL CLEAR (no danger of attack or fallout. Also gives the advice that on the event of no warning.
Film Six: What to do after an attack. This gives advice on checking for outside damage to the home and fire fighting advice with an emphasis on the danger of fallout. 
 Film 7: Life under Fallout Conditions. This section gives advice on living in the post attack environment .It emphasises that it may be a fortnight before any food and water can be provided by local authorities. 

Civil defense
Cold War
Nuclear warfare
Social guidance films
Emergency management in the United Kingdom
Public information films
1964 films
1960s educational films
British educational films